The Derawal are a community of people who originated from the Derajat region, Dera jat consists of area east of suleman ranges and west of River Indus and is inhabited by Saraiki speaking Baloch people. Famous dish of the Region is Sohbat and is native to Derajat.Derajat includes the districts of Dera Ismail Khan, Dera Ghazi Khan, Rajanpur, and Tank in the Khyber Pakhtunkhwa and Punjab provinces of Pakistan. The Baloch districts of Dera Bugti and Jafarabad (Dera Allah Yar) are adjacent to Derajat towards the southwest. The varieties of Saraiki the Derawal people speak are collectively called Derawali dialect (also locally known as Hindki). Pashto and Balochi are spoken in the northern and western parts of Derajat.

All of the Hindu and Sikh Derawal migrated to India at the time of the partition of India in 1947. The neighbourhood of Derawal Nagar in Delhi, gets its name from this community. There are several regional and national Derawal organizations in India today.

Dera Ghazi Khan District
Dera Ismail Khan District
Derajat
Saraiki tribes